Henry Skipwith (died 14 August 1588) was a Member of the Parliament of England for Leicester in 1584 and 1586.

Skipwith was a child of William Skipwith (died 1547) and Alice Dymoke. He married Jane Hall, and had thirteen children, including William Skipwith (died 1610).

See also
 Skipwith baronets

References

Members of the Parliament of England for Leicestershire
1588 deaths
English MPs 1584–1585
English MPs 1586–1587